Bohn is a German surname. Notable people with the surname include:

Adam Bohn, video game developer and founder of Artix Entertainment
Carsten Bohn (born 1948), German musician
Frank P. Bohn (1866–1944), U.S. Representative from Michigan
German von Bohn (1812–1899), German painter
Hans Bohn (1891–1980), German graphic artist and typographer
Henry George Bohn (1796–1884), British publisher
James George Stuart Burges Bohn, British bookseller and bibliographer, brother of Henry George Bohn
Jason Bohn (born 1973), American golfer
John Bohn (1867–1955), mayor of Milwaukee, Wisconsin
Ocke-Schwen Bohn (born 1953), German linguist
Parker Bohn III (born 1963), American bowler
Paul Bohn (born 1955), American chemist
T. J. Bohn (born 1980), American baseball player

See also
Bøhn

German-language surnames